Bargasa or Pargasa (Πάργασα) was a city of ancient Caria. It was a polis (city-state) and a member of the Delian League. There are also coins of Bargasa with the epigraph Βαργασηνῶν. It is mentioned by Strabo, who, after speaking of Cnidus, says, "then Ceramus and Bargasa, small places above the sea."
 
Its site is located near Gökbel, in Milas district, Asiatic Turkey.

References

Populated places in ancient Caria
Former populated places in Turkey
Greek city-states
Members of the Delian League
Milas District
History of Muğla Province